Gustave Florentin Garraux (October 2, 1859 – 7 June 1950) was a Swiss painter, illustrator and visual artist.

Biography 

Garraux attended primary school in Solothurn and then had received a commercial apprenticeship in a large Basel company. He then traveled all over Switzerland as a traveling salesman . After his marriage in the year 1889, he ran an grocery shop in Moutier for 38 years . In parallel to his humble commercial venture, he created an extensive collection of postcards for which he is primarily famous. His works were first shown in 1909 in the Kunstmuseum Bern. In the mid-1910s, Garraux took lessons from Philippe Ritter, professor of drawing at the "Musée d'art industriel de Berne". In 1927 he gave up his business and moved to Bern and later to Langenthal, where he completely devoted himself to his art. His artistic produces mostly involved postcard-sized pictures with humorous content, depicting people in historical costumes. He used to illustrate his private correspondence with small watercolors.

Death 

He spent his old age at the Lindenhof in Langenthal and died there at the age of 90 on 7 June 1950.

Works 
 Florentin Garraux collection in the Musee du Tour Automatique et d'Histoire in Moutier.
 Book illustrations.

Exhibitions 

1909: in the Kunstmuseum Bern, in Solothurn , Pruntrut and Lausanne
1913: à l'Exposition cantonale de Zurich
1922: in Delémont
1994: in the Musée jurassien des Beaux-Arts de Moutier.

Further reading 
 Gustave Amweg, Les Arts dans le Jura bernois et à Bienne , tome 1, Porrentruy, 1937, p. 287-288
 Anne-Marie Steullet, Les messages de Florentin Garraux , in Jura-Pluriel, no 21, 1992
 Jean-Pierre Girod, Florentin Garraux à Moutier , Le Quotidien jurassien , 7 juillet 1997

References 

19th-century Swiss painters
Swiss artists
Postcard artists
Swiss male painters
20th-century Swiss painters
1859 births
1950 deaths
19th-century Swiss male artists
20th-century Swiss male artists